The following is an incomplete list of articles related to the city of Shenzhen, China, sorted in alphabetical order:

0–9 
17th Golden Eagle Awards
2008 Shenzhen anti-police riot
2011 Summer Universiade
2015 Shenzhen landslide

B
Bao'an County
Bao'an District

Buji Town
Baishizhou
Bao'an Stadium
Beihuan Boulevard
Binhai Boulevard

C
China Merchants Bank Tower
ChiNext
Coastal City
Chang Fu Jin Mao Tower
China Chuneng Tower
Civic Center (Shenzhen)
Coastal City
Chiwan
Chung Ying Street
China Resources Headquarters
Christ the King Church, Shenzhen

D
Danzhutou
Dasha River (Guangdong)
Dapeng Peninsula
Dongmen Subdistrict, Shenzhen
Dameisha Beach
Dapeng New District
Dongjiaotou
Dongbin Road

E
East Pacific Center
East Lake Park

F
Fairy Lake Botanical Garden
Fuyong Ferry Terminal
Futian District

Futian Port
Futian station
Fenghuang Village

G

Guangming District
Guomao Building
Guangmingcheng Railway Station
Guanlan River

H
Happy Valley Shenzhen
Hanking Center
He Xiangning Art Museum
Heung Kong Tower
Honghu Park
Hon Kwok City Center
Huangbei Subdistrict
Huangbeiling
Huanggang Port
Huaqiangbei
Huawei
Huanggang Port

I
ITF Women's Circuit – Shenzhen

J
Jasic Incident
Jiangsu Tower
Jihe Expressway

K
KK100

L
Lianhuashan Park
List of administrative divisions of Shenzhen
List of parks in Shenzhen
List of lakes and reservoirs in Shenzhen
List of tallest buildings in Shenzhen
Longgang District, Shenzhen
Longhua District, Shenzhen
Lianhuashan Park
Liantang Subdistrict
Luohu District

Luohu Port

M
Minsk World
Mirs Bay
Meilin Reservoir

N
Nansha Ferry Port
Nanshan District, Shenzhen
Nan'ao Subdistrict
Nantou Subdistrict
National Supercomputing Center (Shenzhen)
Nei Lingding Island
Nanshan (mountain)
New World Center (Shenzhen)
Nanhai Boulevard
NEO Tower

O
Overseas Chinese Town
OCT Bay
OCT East
One Shenzhen Bay

P
Panglin Plaza
ParaEngine
Pingshan District
Pinghu Railway Station
Ping An Finance Center
Peking University Shenzhen Graduate School
Port of Shenzhen
People's Park (Shenzhen)

Q
Qianhai
Qiniangshan

S
Shenzhen
Sha Tau Kok River
Sham Chun River
SEG Plaza
Shekou Industrial Zone
Shennan Road
Shenzhen Bay Park
Shenzhen Bay Port
Shenzhen International Garden and Flower Expo Park
Shenzhen Special Economic Zone
Shenzhen–Hong Kong cross-boundary students
Soviet aircraft carrier Minsk
Shenzhen American International School
Shenzhen Broadcasting Center Building
Shenzhen Reservoir
Shenzhen Convention and Exhibition Center
Shenzhen Safari Park
Shenzhen Special Zone Press Tower
Shenzhen Stadium
Shenzhen Stock Exchange
Shenzhen Universiade Sports Centre
Shun Hing Square
South University of Science and Technology of China
Shenzhen University
Shenzhen Polytechnic
Shenzhen Radio and TV University
Shenzhen Institute of Information Technology
Shenzhen Graduate School of Harbin Institute of Technology
Shenzhen Bao'an International Airport
Shenzhen railway station
Shenzhen North station
Shenzhen East railway station
Shenzhen West railway station
Shenzhen Pingshan railway station
Shenzhen Special Zone Press Tower
Shenzhen Broadcasting Center Building
Shenzhen Museum
Shenzhen F.C.
Shenzhen Tram
Splendid China Folk Village
Shenzhen Safari Park
Shum Yip Upperhills Tower 1
Shekou Passenger Terminal
Shekou

T
Taizishan Agricultural Trade Market
Transport in Shenzhen
TurboJET
The Chinese University of Hong Kong, Shenzhen
Time is Money, Efficiency is Life

W
Wutongshan Park
Wanghai Road

X
Xichong, Shenzhen
Xin'an Subdistrict, Shenzhen
Xinghua Road, Shenzhen
Xili Reservoir

Y
Yangmeikeng
Yantian District
Yitian Holiday Plaza

Z
Zhongshan Park (Shenzhen)
Zhengshun Plaza

Shenzhen-related lists